Roger Stephen Kimmerly is a Canadian former politician, who represented the electoral district of Whitehorse South Centre in the Yukon Legislative Assembly from 1981 to 1989. He was a member of the Yukon New Democratic Party.

He was first elected in a by-election in 1981, following the resignation of Jack Hibberd. His victory resulted in the New Democrats replacing the Yukon Liberal Party as the Official Opposition in the Legislative Assembly. He was subsequently re-elected in the 1982 and 1985 elections.

He did not run in the 1989 election.

References

1948 births
Living people
Politicians from Ottawa
Yukon New Democratic Party MLAs